The organon model is a model of communication by German psychologist and linguist Karl Ludwig Bühler (1879 – 1963). It was published in German in 1934. and not translated into English until 1990. In it he defined the functions of communication according to which linguistic communication can be described. Bühler's work influenced the communication model of Roman Jakobson.

Buhler's model also apparently influenced Lev Vygotsky who, in discussing memory and goal-directed learning, wrote: "According to K. Buhler, speech thinks for us."

Bühler identified the following three communicative functions:
 the expressive function (Ausdrucksfunktion)
 the representation function (Darstellungsfunktion)
 the conative function (Appellfunktion, i.e. appealing function).

Background
Karl Bühler used the Cratylus of Plato as the basis for his remarks. Bühler described this relationship as a 'three-foundations scheme': oneself - to the other - about things (einer - dem anderen - über die Dinge).

Bühler's organon model criticized the material thinking of behaviorism, which according to him had renewed the "flatus-vocis nominalism of the incipient Middle Ages in modern form."

References

Communication theory